Diponegoro University (abbreviated as Undip) is a public university in Semarang, Central Java, Indonesia. Founded in 1957 as a private university by the Semarang University Foundation, which later in 1960 became public university, and named after Javanese Prince Diponegoro. It is a pioneer of higher learning institutions in Indonesia and the first and oldest education corporation in Central Java. Nationally, Undip is in sixth position in Ministry of Research, Technology and Higher Education's 2017 ranking and is one of the top 1,000 universities in the world by the 2019 QS World University Rankings.

History 

In the early 1950s, people in Central Java, especially in Semarang, needed a university to provide higher education learning and teaching facilities. It has been purpose to support of government in handling and in conducting all sectors of development, especially in the field of education. At that time, it was only Gajah Mada University as a public university which provides higher education for people in Yogyakarta and also Central Java.

As the number of senior high school graduates have continuously been increasing without increment in the number of universities, some graduates may not be able to gain a seat in higher education in north of Central Java. Considering this situation, MR. Imam Bardjo and his colleagues formed an educational foundation, namely Yayasan Universitas Semarang (Foundation of Semarang University), noted by notary R.M. Soeprapto on Notarial Deed No 59, 4 December 1956. The foundation was the first step to establish a university in Semarang, namely Semarang University, which was officially opened on 9 January 1957, and Mr. Imam Bardjo was the first President (Rector) of the university.

When Semarang University celebrated its third Dies Natalis (anniversary) on 9 January 1960, President of Indonesia, Sukarno renamed the Semarang University as Diponegoro University. Changing the name of Semarang University was intended as a tribute to the university's performance in development of higher education in Central Java. The President's decision was confirmed by the Government Regulation No. 7 1961 and Decree Minister of Education, Teaching and Culture No. 101247 / UU on 3 December 1960.

The decision was retroactive to 15 October 1957, and this date is commemorated as the day of Diponegoro University's Dies Natalis as well as for remembering "Five Days Battle in Semarang", which is part of Indonesian National Revolution war that took place in Semarang City. Diponegoro University chose the date as its Dies Natalis for continuing national heroes’ vision and mission for Indonesia's independence, by developing the nation's next generation.

The year of 1957 was defined as the year of Diponegoro University's establishment, by considering history of Semarang University as a private university founded in 1957 was an embryo of Diponegoro University. And the date of establishment 15 October 1957 was stated in Rector's report on the 13th Dies Natalis of Diponegoro University.

Currently under Government Regulations No. 81/2014 and Government Regulations of the Republic of Indonesia No. 52/2015, Diponegoro University earns the status of PTN-BH (Perguruan Tinggi Negeri-Badan Hukum/State-Owned Higher Education with a Legal Entity Status).

Academics

Faculties 

Undip has 11 official faculties and 2 schools.

Faculty of Animal and Agricultural Sciences
Faculty of Economics and Business
Faculty of Engineering
Faculty of Fisheries and Marine Sciences
Faculty of Humanities
Faculty of Law
Faculty of Medicine
Faculty of Psychology
Faculty of Public Health
Faculty of Sciences and Mathematics
Faculty of Social and Political Sciences
Postgraduate School
Vocational School

Ranking 

In the QS World University Rankings 2020, the Diponegoro University ranked in the range of 801–1000 globally and ranked eighth in Indonesia. Meanwhile, in the QS Asian University Rankings 2021, the Diponegoro University ranked 241st in Asia and ranked ninth in Indonesia. Diponegoro University also ranked in the range of 301–500 globally by QS Graduate Employability Ranking.

In the Times Higher Education World University Rankings 2021, Diponegoro University is ranked in the range of 1001+ globally. Undip also ranked in the range of 101–200th globally in Impact Rankings 2020, where Undip ranked 49th globally in Impact Rankings: Responsible Consumption and Production 2020. In THE WUR 2021 also ranked Diponegoro University as number 4 in Indonesia. In June 2021, in the QS World University Rankings 2022, Diponegoro University is ranked in the range of 1001+ globally and ranked eighth in Indonesia.

Diponegoro University's ranking and accreditation are follows:

 BAN-PT: Diponegoro University obtained accreditation “A” in BAN-PT (13/SK/BAN-PT/Akred/PT/II/2018)
 4ICU: Undip rank third best campuses in Indonesia. While the positions 1 through 2 respectively occupied by the Gadjah Mada University (UGM) and University of Indonesia (UI).
 QS: Diponegoro University ranked 8 in Indonesia in the QS World University Ranking and ranked 9 in Indonesia in the QS Asian University Ranking
THE: Diponegoro University is in the fourth position out of 9 universities in Indonesia that THE WUR has recognized, as a respected position at the international level.
 World Greenmetrics: Diponegoro University ranking is 39 with score of 8,025 (ranked 2 in Indonesia)
 Scopus: Undip scientific publications indexed in Scopus totalled 7,790 documents and ranking seventh in Indonesia.

Admissions

Undergraduate 
Students are required to pass examinations for admissions to the university.

Admissions test required for application and admissions:

 SNMPTN (selected-national admission)
 SBMPTN (written test-national admission)
 UM/Ujian mandiri (independent test, held by the university)
 SBUB/Seleksi Bibit Unggul Berprestasi (selection by achievements-held by the university)
 IUP/International Undergraduate Program (international program-held by the university)

The academic year is divided into semesters like in many other universities of Indonesia. In addition to low tuition fees the university provides the students with extra financial assistance in the form of scholarships. Undip is one of the universities that offers online education.

Postgraduate 
Diponegoro University offers the number of Postgraduate Programs for all prospective students in Indonesia and international students from around the world. There are 34 Postgraduate Study Programs, consist of 8 doctorate and 28 master programs offered. These programs are opened widely for the university graduates achieving higher degree of education. The university gives a very high consideration and priority to the quality of the postgraduate program. Development of education, research and community service are based on the university's scientific pattern, that is coastal eco-development. Program is delivered in accordance to the program nature and domain, with customized assessments at program and subject level.

International students
International applicants for admission to UNDIP's undergraduate program are required to complete or are completing high school. The medium of instruction for international classes at UNDIP is English. As of 2020, there are about 230 international students in Diponegoro University.

Achievements 

 128 UNDIP students win an honourable position in the 2020 Student Creativity Program (PKM) competition held by the Ministry of Education and Culture.
 UNDIP students from the Faculty of Engineering wins gold medals in the 12th 2020 Euroinvent International Competition.
 Journal from Faculty of Animal and Agricultural Sciences (FPP) UNDIP penetrates to international level, indexed Scopus Q3, a fairly prestigious position and currently there are only two similar journals from Indonesia in this level.
 27 Diponegoro University Professors were included in the list of 500 Best Researchers in Indonesia. This announcement was made by the Minister of Research and Technology/Head of the Research and Innovation Agency (Menristek/Kepala BRIN).
 Outstanding Reviewers Award 2019 for Dr. Choirul Anam from the Journal of Biomedical Physics and Engineering Express.
 UNDIP Public Relations Achieves Bronze Winner at the PR Indonesia Awards 2020.
 Diponegoro University (Undip) have ranked fourth in Indonesia based the World campus rating agency utilizing web popularity of each universities, namely 4ICU UniRank.
 Diponegoro University have received an award for UI GreenMetric in achieving the fourth place at the national level and 50th in the world from a total of 780 universities from 85 countries in the world.
 Re-obtaining rotating trophy of Teaching Farm Charoend Pokphand 2019, FPP UNDIP became the best of Indonesia.
 The Minister of Law and Human Rights (Menkumham) awarded Universitas Diponegoro (UNDIP) as the university that issued the most Patent Rights in 2018.

Collaboration with overseas universities 
Since 1991, Diponegoro University starts to establish collaboration with different foreign institutions, including universities, NGOs, government agencies and companies around the globe. The International collaborations in terms of education, research exchange program, joint scientific research, training, academic exchange, scientist exchange, and student exchange program.

As of April 2020, Undip has collaborations with 116 international institutions in 28 countries. They are top universities from various country across Asia, Australia, Americas and Europe. Some of the examples are:

 University of Western Australia, Australia
 Curtin University, Australia
 University of Queensland, Australia
 Tsinghua University, China
 University of Zagreb, Croatia
 Aarhus University, Denmark
 University of Poitiers, France
 Technische Universität Darmstadt, Germany
 University of Trento, Italy
 Kagoshima University, Japan
 Chiba University, Japan
 Toyohashi University of Technology, Japan
 Radboud University, Netherlands
 National University of Singapore, Singapore
 Kangwon National University, South Korea
 Gyeongsang National University, South Korea
 National Sun Yat-sen University, Taiwan
 Tunghai University, Taiwan
 University of Birmingham, United Kingdom
 University of Sheffield, United Kingdom
 Boston University, United States
 Oklahoma State University, United States

Research organisations 
There are numerous research centres and service centres in Diponegoro University under LPPM (Lembaga Penelitian dan Pengabdian Masyarakat/Institute for Research and Community Service) of Diponegoro University:

 Centre for Gender Studies
 Health Research Centre
 Centre for Development Studies
 Centre for Service Training Programme
 Community Service Programme (KKN) Service Centre
 Public Service Programme Centre
 Centre for Promotion and Publication of Research Results and Intellectual Property Rights services (HKI)
 Centre for Disaster Studies
 Centre for Development Policy and Management Studies
 Natural Medicine Research Centre
 Centre for Energy Policy Studies (Pusaka Energia)
 Centre for Biomass and Renewable Energy Studies
 Anti-Corruption Research Centre
 Centre for Marine Studies
 Diponegoro Disaster Response Team (D-DART Undip)
 Centre for Sport and Youth Studies
 Asia Studies Centre
 Centre of ASEAN Study
 Centre of Trade & WTO Policy
 Centre of International Human Rights & Humanitarian Law Studies
 Centre for Bio Mechanics, Bio Material, Bio Mechatronics, and Bio Signal Processing (CBIOM3S)
 Centre for Coastal Rehabilitation and Disaster Mitigation Studies (CoREM)
 Environmental Research Centre (PPLH)
 Halal Study Centre
 Laboratory for Disorders Due to Iodine Deficiency (GAKY)
 Leprosy Study Centre
 Medical Education Unit (MEDU Diponegoro)
 Centre of Epidemiology and Biostatistics Unit (CEBU Diponegoro)
 Centre of Avian Influenza, Molecular and Clinical Microbiology
 Centre of Tropical Infectious Diseases (CENTRID)
 Centre of Biomedical Research (CEBIOR)
 Centre of Nutrition Research (CENURE)
 Centre for Geothermal Research (Pusat Penelitian Geothermal)
 Centre of Marine Ecology and Biomonitoring for Sustainable Aquaculture (Ce-MEBSA)
 Centre for Plasma Research (CPR)
 Family Empowerment Centre (PPK)
 Aging Research Centre (ARC)
 Centre for Experiment and Psychometric Studies (CEPS)

Campuses 

Undip is in Semarang — the capital city of Central Java. The university has 8 campuses outside Semarang as far away as Jepara, about 70 km northeast Semarang.

Main campus 
Tembalang Campus is the largest and the newest. Tembalang occupies about 213 hectares with an administrative center, Central library, rectorate of Widya Puraya, all of the 11 faculties and 2 schools.
Pleburan Campus is the oldest campus since the existing campuses were merged in its early establishment. The campus occupies about 8 hectares area, with the Magister and Doctorate Program and some operational units.

Other campus 
Gunung Brintik Campus and Dr. Soetomo Campus has the Faculty of Medicine. It is near Dr. Kariadi Hospital.
Teluk Awur Campus (60 hectares) is in Jepara, 70 km northeast Semarang. (Faculty of Fisheries and Marine Science).
Mlonggo Campus, Jepara. (Faculty of Medicine)
Kalisari Campus, Semarang. (Laboratory of Faculty of Engineering)
Ade Irma Suryani Campus, Jepara. (Laboratory for Faculty of Fisheries and Marine Science).
Kagok Housing, Semarang.

Facilities

Dormitory 
Rumah Susun Sewa bagi Mahasiswa (Rusunawa) is the student dormitory building. The building has five twin blocks:
Building A has 84 rooms with 252 students.
Building B, C, and D, each have 96 rooms with 288 students with three persons per room.
Building E has 114 rooms. It is the newest dormitory building, construction finished in 2018.

Central library 
Diponegoro University Library (Perpustakaan Universitas Diponegoro) is centred in Widya Puraya Central Library in the Tembalang campus and comprises over 400 individual libraries and over 4,000 volumes. Faculties have department libraries and literature from journal alumni.

Mosque 
Maskam (Masjid Kampus Undip) or Undip Campus Mosque is a mosque at the Tembalang campus. It's surrounded by a natural environment and nearby central campus' area. The architecture is from 'pyramid' building and became one of the most unusual mosques in Semarang. Construction began in 2004 and finished in 2009.

Student centre 
Diponegoro University Student Centre (SC) is the central building for Undip students' activities. The student centre was built to fulfil the needs for a place where students can express their creativity and increase their achievement, and home bases for numerous UKM (Unit Kegiatan Mahasiswa/Student Activities Unit). It has several rooms: one pavilion, 40 rooms for UKM, one prayer room, one canteen, and two transit rooms.

Sport 

 Diponegoro University Stadium
 Football field
 Athletic track
 Calisthenics corner
 International Indoor Stadium Undip
 Badminton & tennis court
 Basketball court

Other facilities 
Other facilities in Undip campus are:
The ICT Centre (international office, scholarship centre, international meeting room, etc.)
Undip Career Centre (UCC)
Training centre I and II
Undip's Pertamina petrol station
Diponegoro National Hospital (Rumah Sakit Nasional Diponegoro/RSND)
Diponegoro Educational Reservoir (Waduk Pendidikan Diponegoro)
Integrated laboratory
Prof. Soedarto Auditorium
Health centre, etc.

Notable staff and alumni 

Undip has produced over 200,000 graduates. Many of them become a public figure, politician, entrepreneur, writer, artist, and many more. Some of the selected examples are below:
Anindya Kusuma Putri, Puteri Indonesia 2015, Top 15 Miss Universe 2015, spokesperson for the Indonesian Minister of Youth & Sports Affairs. 
Arief Hidayat, fifth Chief Justice of the Constitutional Court of Indonesia.
Baharuddin Lopa, Indonesian Minister of Justice and Human Rights and later Attorney General of Indonesia.
Bondan Winarno, Indonesian culinary expert and writer.
Darmanto Jatman (Professor Emeritus of Psychology Faculty of Diponegoro University, humanist, philosopher and poet Indonesia).
Hendarman Supandji (Attorney General of the Republic of Indonesia 2007–2010).
Ko Kwat Tiong, lawyer, members of the Volksraad, politician and Indonesian nationalist.
Michael Bambang Hartono (owner of PT Djarum).
Mohamad Nasir, Minister of Research, Technology, and Higher Education of the Republic of Indonesia (in Working Cabinet, 2014–2019).
Muladi (Minister of Justice in the Seventh Development Cabinet and Development Reform Cabinet of Indonesia in 2005–2011).
Robert Budi Hartono (owner of PT Djarum).
Sanitiar Burhanuddin, present Attorney General of Indonesia, serving since October 2019 in the cabinet of President Joko Widodo.
Soekarwo (Governor of East Java 2009–2014).
Taufik Kurniawan, Deputy Speaker of People's Representative Council of the Republic of Indonesia (DPR RI) in 2014–2019.
Tjahjo Kumolo, Indonesian Minister of Administrative and Bureaucratic Reform. Previously served as Minister of Home Affairs in 2014–2019.
Trinity, Indonesian traveller, writer, and blogger.
Triyanto Triwikromo, Indonesian writer.

References

External links 

 

Buildings and structures in Semarang
Diponegoro University
Educational institutions established in 1956
Universities in Central Java
Diponegoro
Indonesian state universities
1956 establishments in Indonesia